Oxypora is a genus of large polyp stony corals. Members of this genus are colonial corals and are generally foliaceous, usually with very thin leaves. They are native to the Indo-Pacific and are sometimes found in reef aquariums.

Genera
The World Register of Marine Species lists the following species:

Oxypora convoluta  Veron, 2000
Oxypora crassispinosa  Nemenzo, 1979
Oxypora egyptensis  Veron, 2000
Oxypora glabra  Nemenzo, 1959
Oxypora lacera  (Verrill, 1864)

References

Lobophylliidae
Scleractinia genera